The Most Reverend Ambrose Mathalaimuthu D.D. (25 July 1925 – 15 November 2009) was Bishop Emeritus of the Roman Catholic Diocese of Coimbatore, India.

Born in Nagalur, Tamil Nadu, he was ordained as a priest on 21 December 1951. He was appointed bishop of the Roman Catholic Diocese of Tuticorin on 30 August 1971 and was ordained on 9 December 1971. On 6 December 1979, he was appointed bishop of the Coimbatore Diocese, retiring on 10 July 2002, shortly before his 77th birthday.

References

1925 births
2009 deaths
People from Tamil Nadu
20th-century Roman Catholic bishops in India